The Cronulla Shark Island Swim Challenge is an annual event of , held at Cronulla Beach in Sydney, Australia.

History
The first Cronulla Shark Island Swim Challenge was held in October 1987. There was a medium swell and the water was choppy. There were only sixty-four competitors. Long-distance swimmer David O'Brien was the inaugural winner.

References

External links
Official Swim Website
Cronulla SLSC
Cronulla SLSC
Chris Dixon Photography

Recurring sporting events established in 1987
Swimming competitions in Australia
Open water swimming competitions
Sports competitions in Sydney
1987 establishments in Australia